Christina Basin Airport  is located near Christina Basin, Alberta, Canada.

See also
 Christina Lake Aerodrome

References

External links
Page about this airport on COPA's Places to Fly airport directory

Registered aerodromes in Alberta
Lac La Biche County